Joanne Mary Joyner (born 24 May 1977) is an English actress. She is known for her roles as Tanya Branning in the BBC soap opera EastEnders and Mandy Carter in Channel 4 drama Ackley Bridge. Since 2018, she has starred as Luella Shakespeare in the BBC crime drama series Shakespeare & Hathaway: Private Investigators.

Early life
Joyner was born in Harlow, Essex to Anne (née McCormick) and Peter Joyner. She has one older brother, David. In 1999, she graduated from the Royal Welsh College of Music & Drama in Cardiff with a BA in Acting.

Career
After a stint of guest roles in shows such as  Always and Everyone, The Cops, Heartbeat and Clocking Off, Joyner came to prominence after playing Beth Nicholls in Channel 4 comedy drama No Angels between 2004 and 2006. She later appeared in four episodes of North & South as Fanny Thornton and in two episodes of Doctor Who as Lynda Moss. In June 2006, Joyner began appearing as Tanya Branning in BBC One soap opera EastEnders. Joyner originally turned down the role on the show as she had doubts over whether she could work in a soap opera. She said "It was a massive decision. I said no originally. Playing someone in a soap is a big responsibility. People are very protective of the soap and if you are rubbish you can't get away from it." Also, having worked quietly and successfully in the industry for eight years, Joyner was unsure if she would be comfortable with the level of fame being on EastEnders would bring her. Joyner won the Most Popular Actress award at the Digital Spy Soap Awards in 2008 for the part of Tanya and also went on to win Best Dramatic Performance at the 2008 British Soap Awards, as well as making the final four in the Best Actress category. Joyner was nominated for the Best Actress award at the All About Soap Awards in 2012 and later won the award. In 2012, Joyner and co-star Jake Wood won the Best On-Screen Partnership category at the British Soap Awards. On Digital Spy's 2012 end of year reader poll, Joyner was nominated for Best Female Soap Actor and came fourth with 13.4% of the vote.

Whilst still appearing in EastEnders in 2011, Joyner appeared in BBC One comedy drama Candy Cabs as Jackie O’Sullivan. On 1 May 2012, it was reported that Joyner would take a prolonged break from EastEnders at the end of her current contract to spend time with her family. However, on 1 April 2013, it was announced that Joyner's departure would be indefinite as she wished to try new career paths. Speaking of this, Joyner said: "I love playing Tanya and being part of such a great show, but she has been on quite a rollercoaster over the past seven years and I have come to realise that it's right for her to step away from Walford for a bit longer than originally planned. I have been very fortunate to have been part of some fantastic storylines over the years, and I have worked with some wonderful people during my time on the show which I will always be very grateful for, but I feel that as a mother and an actress it is time for me to explore some other avenues for a while." Joyner filmed her final scenes on 15 May 2013. She departed the show on 28 June 2013. Joyner reprised the role of Tanya in EastEnders for the 30th anniversary specials in February 2015 and again on Christmas Day 2017 as part of the storyline surrounding the exits of her onscreen daughters.

In June 2017, Joyner began portraying Mandy Carter in Channel 4’s drama Ackley Bridge. She departed from the series in the fourth series in 2021. In February 2018, she started to play Luella Shakespeare, alongside Mark Benton, in the BBC One comedy drama Shakespeare & Hathaway: Private Investigators. In December 2021, Joyner appeared in the Netflix drama series Stay Close as Erin Cartwright. Then in 2022, she starred in the Channel 5 drama series Riptide.

Personal life
Joyner announced in July 2009 that she was pregnant as a result of IVF treatment. She gave birth to fraternal twins in December 2009.

Filmography

Awards and nominations

References

External links

 

Living people
1977 births
Alumni of the Royal Welsh College of Music & Drama
English soap opera actresses
English television actresses
People from Harlow